Baboucarr-Blaise Ismaila Jagne (born February 11, 1955) was the foreign minister of the Gambia from 1995 until 1997 and from August 30, 2001 until October 14 2004. He was the Gambian Permanent Representative to the United Nations from 1998 to 2001, and was President of the United Nations Security Council in June 1999.

References

1955 births
Living people
Permanent Representatives of the Gambia to the United Nations
Foreign ministers of the Gambia